Smokuč is one of ten villages in the Municipality of Žirovnica in the Upper Carniola region of Slovenia.

References

External links

Populated places in the Municipality of Žirovnica